The II Army Corps / II AK was a corps level command of the Prussian and then the Imperial German Armies from the 19th Century to World War I.

It was established on 3 April 1820 with headquarters initially in Berlin. From 1837, the headquarters moved to Stettin (now Szczecin, Poland), back to Berlin in 1863, before finally settling in Stettin from 1870. The Corps catchment area included the Province of Pomerania, the district (Regierungsbezirk) of Bromberg from the Province of Posen and the Province of West Prussia. Later, the West Prussian districts were transferred to the new XVII Corps District.

In peacetime, the Corps was assigned to the VIII Army Inspectorate, which became the 1st Army at the start of the First World War. The Corps headquarters was upgraded to form the headquarters of the South Army on 10 January 1915.

The Corps was reformed post-war, before being finally disbanded in 1919.

Austro-Prussian War 
The II Corps formed part of Prince Friedrich Karl of Prussia's 1st Army and fought in the Austro-Prussian War against Austria in 1866, including the Battle of Königgrätz.

Franco-Prussian War 
The Corps fought in the Franco-Prussian War against France in 1870-71 as part of the 2nd Army. It saw action in the Battle of Gravelotte, Battle of Villiers (playing a key part), the Siege of Metz, and the Siege of Paris, among other actions.

Peacetime organisation 
The 25 peacetime Corps of the German Army (Guards, I - XXI, I - III Bavarian) had a reasonably standardised organisation. Each consisted of two divisions with usually two infantry brigades, one field artillery brigade and a cavalry brigade each. Each brigade normally consisted of two regiments of the appropriate type, so each Corps normally commanded 8 infantry, 4 field artillery and 4 cavalry regiments. There were exceptions to this rule:
V, VI, VII, IX and XIV Corps each had a 5th infantry brigade (so 10 infantry regiments)
II, XIII, XVIII and XXI Corps had a 9th infantry regiment
I, VI and XVI Corps had a 3rd cavalry brigade (so 6 cavalry regiments)
the Guards Corps had 11 infantry regiments (in 5 brigades) and 8 cavalry regiments (in 4 brigades).
Each Corps also directly controlled a number of other units. This could include one or more 
Foot Artillery Regiment
Jäger Battalion
Pioneer Battalion
Train Battalion

World War I

Organisation on mobilisation 
On mobilization on 2 August 1914, the Corps was restructured. The 3rd Cavalry Brigade was withdrawn to form part of the 4th Cavalry Division and the 4th Cavalry Brigade was broken up and its regiments assigned to the divisions as reconnaissance units. The divisions received engineer companies and other support units from the Corps headquarters. In summary, II Corps mobilised with 24 infantry battalions, 8 machine gun companies (48 machine guns), 8 cavalry squadrons, 24 field artillery batteries (144 guns), 4 heavy artillery batteries (16 guns), 3 pioneer companies and an aviation detachment.

Combat chronicle 
On mobilisation, II Corps was assigned to the 1st Army, which was on the right wing of the forces for the Schlieffen Plan offensive in August 1914 on the Western Front. It saw action in the invasion of Belgium (Battle of Mons), the First Battle of the Marne, and the Race to the Sea (culminating in the First Battle of Ypres as part of the 6th Army). Thereafter, the Corps was transferred to the Eastern Front, joining the 9th Army. The Corps headquarters was upgraded to form the headquarters of the South Army on 10 January 1915.

Commanders 
The II Corps had the following commanders during its existence:

See also 

Franco-Prussian War order of battle
German Army order of battle (1914)
List of Imperial German infantry regiments
List of Imperial German artillery regiments
List of Imperial German cavalry regiments
Order of battle at Mons
Order of battle of the First Battle of the Marne
Order of First Battle of Ypres

References

Bibliography 
 
 
 
 
 
 

Corps of Germany in World War I
Military units and formations established in 1820
Military units and formations disestablished in 1915